Helsingfors Segelklubb ry (HSK), Helsinki Sailing Club, is a yacht club in Lauttasaari, Helsinki (Finland).

History
The club was established in 1899 under the name Helsingfors Arbetare Segelklubb (Helsinki workers sailing club). Most members were Swedish-speaking Finns. The first harbor was located in the western part of Helsinki. In 1919, after the Independence of Finland, the club was registered with the name Helsingfors Segelklubb.

References

External links
Official website

Sports clubs established in 1899
Yacht clubs in Finland
Organisations based in Helsinki
Sports clubs in Helsinki
1899 establishments in Finland